The Mayor of Isernia is an elected politician who, along with the Isernia's City Council, is accountable for the strategic government of Isernia in Molise, Italy. The current Mayor is Piero Castrataro, supported by the centre-left coalition, who took office on 19 October 2021.

Overview
According to the Italian Constitution, the Mayor of Isernia is member of the City Council.

The Mayor is elected by the population of Isernia, who also elect the members of the City Council, controlling the Mayor's policy guidelines and is able to enforce his resignation by a motion of no confidence. The Mayor is entitled to appoint and release the members of his government.

Since 1998 the Mayor is elected directly by Isernia's electorate: in all mayoral elections in Italy in cities with a population higher than 15,000 the voters express a direct choice for the mayor or an indirect choice voting for the party of the candidate's coalition. If no candidate receives at least 50% of votes, the top two candidates go to a second round after two weeks. The election of the City Council is based on a direct choice for the candidate with a preference vote: the candidate with the majority of the preferences is elected. The number of the seats for each party is determined proportionally.

Italian Republic (since 1946)

City Council election (1946-1998)
From 1946 to 1998, the Mayor of Isernia was elected by the City's Council.

Direct election (since 1998)
Since 1998, under provisions of new local administration law, the Mayor of Isernia is chosen by direct election.

Timeline

References

Isernia
 
Politics of Molise
Isernia